Major-General Katy Perry (born  1964) is head of the Israel Prison Service, appointed in 2021.

Biography 
Perry served in the IDF Central Command from 1982 to 1984. After her release, she studied at the Hebrew University of Jerusalem, and during her studies enlisted in the Prison Service in 1987. She served in the Intelligence Division as a criminal assessment officer and as a sources and budget officer. She served as a criminal and criminal assessment officer in the Southern District, and later served as an intelligence officer at Ayalon Prison.

In 2002, she was appointed an intelligence officer. She completed an inter-service course for intelligence, and in 2006 was appointed deputy commander of the Hadarim detention center. In 2007 she was appointed an intelligence officer in the Central District, and in 2008 she was appointed head of the prisoner's department, and in 2010 she was appointed head of the Hadarim Detention Center. Perry then served as head of the Human Resources Administration and deputy commander of the Central District.

In April 2018, she was promoted to the rank of Commissioner. In August 2019, she was appointed Head of the Southern District in the Israel Prison Service. She is the first woman to be appointed to the position of district headquarters at the IPS. 

In December 2020, the Minister of Internal Security, Amir Ohana, decided to appoint Perry as the 18th IPS Commissioner.

On January 24, 2021, Perry was appointed Commissioner of Prisons and promoted to the rank of Major-Gondar.

During her tenure, the Gilboa Prison break happened, and as such Perry faced calls to resign.

Education and personal life 
Perry holds a bachelor's and master's degree in Islamic and Middle Eastern studies from the Hebrew University of Jerusalem, and a master's degree in political science from the University of Haifa and the National Security College. Perry is married to Ofer Perry, an independent investment banker and former VP of Marketing at the Postal Authority, and they have three children.

Two of Perry's brothers, Ehud Yifrach and S. (who later became a state witness) were arrested in 2013 on suspicion of bribing employees of the Tel Aviv Water Corporation, Mei Avivim. Perry pressured IPS workers to define her brother as "labor prisoners" who perform kitchen and cleaning work and enjoy greater freedom of movement in prison. They were convicted of fraud and bribery, and served prison terms in parallel with her service in the IPS.

On the other hand, it was alleged on her behalf that she severed ties with her brother in 2015, and that she never tried to influence their case.

Sources 

Living people
Israeli people
1960s births
Hebrew University of Jerusalem alumni